The Haitian Chess Federation ( - FHE) is the national organization for chess in Haiti. The current president is Philippe Victor Chatelain who has been elected after the former President Jean Lamothe died on August 22, 2017, the Vice-President is Gottfried Kräuchi, and the treasurer is Jean Philippe Bonne Annee. The headquarters of the Haitian Chess Federation is Port-au-Prince. The Haitian federation was founded in 1985. The Haitian Chess Federation is a member of the FIDE (Fédération Internationale des Échecs) and the Association internationale des échecs francophones (AIDEF) (International Association of Francophone Chess).

In 2008, launched the Academie d’Echecs (Chess Academy), a non-for-profit organization to promote chess playing in schools.
The Haitian national chess team start to participate in olympiad in 1986 Since 2005 Haitian chess federation organize annual interschool tournament. The first participation of a school in Hinche was 2011 and the Lycee Dumarsais Estime won the Throphee Twice 2012 and 2013 before it was topple down by Avenue Maurepas School in Saint in 2014 and 2015.

References

External links
 

Haiti
Chess in Haiti
Chess
1985 establishments in Haiti
Sports organizations established in 1985
Chess organizations
1985 in chess